One World One Love is an album by Michael Bolton, with collaborations by Tami Chynn, Ne-Yo and Lady Gaga.

Track listing

Certifications and sales

Release history

See also
List of certified albums in Romania

References

External links
Nateandjakeandme.blogspot.com
Commons.wikimedia.org

2009 albums
Michael Bolton albums
Albums produced by the Messengers (producers)